The Codices Ambrosiani A–E are five biblical manuscripts dating to the 6th–11th centuries CE now in the Biblioteca Ambrosiana in Milan. They are written by different hands and in different alphabets. The codices contain scattered passages from the Old Testament (Nehemiah) and the New Testament (including parts of the Gospels and the Epistles), as well as some commentaries known as Skeireins, rare survivals in the Gothic language.

Codex Ambrosianus A contains parts of the Epistles and the Gothic Calendar. It consists of 204 pages, of which 190 are legible, 2 are illegible and 12 are empty.
Codex Ambrosianus B contains parts of the Epistles, and consists of 156 pages, of which two are empty. The Codex Ambrosianus B.21 is written in Syriac language and script. It is the basis of the Leiden Peshitta critical edition of the Peshitta Old Testament (Leiden siglum 7a1). Nominally dated to the 7th century, the consensus is that it is not older than the 6th century. It contains Apocrypha, 4 Ezra, 2 Baruch, 3 and 4 Maccabees, and a part of Josephus on the Maccabees.
Codex Ambrosianus C consists of two leaves and contains fragments of chapters 25 to 27 of the Gospel of Matthew.

See also

 List of New Testament Latin manuscripts
 Codex Carolinus

References

6th-century biblical manuscripts
7th-century biblical manuscripts
Ambrosianuset
Gothic Bible
Manuscripts of the Ambrosiana collections